Mademoiselle Zhivago is an album by pop singer Lara Fabian. The whole set of songs composed by Fabian with Igor Krutoy is in English, French, Italian, Spanish and also in Russian.

Track listing

Charts

Weekly charts

Year-end charts

Movie
In 2013 the musical feature film "Mademoiselle Zhivago" was published. The 52 minute film, starring Lara Fabian herself in the main role and Max Barskih in the biggest supporting role, features all songs of the Mademoiselle Zhivago album. It was directed by the prize-winning Ukrainian director Alan Badoev.

References

Lara Fabian albums
2010 albums